Hamidabad (also Romanized as Ḩamīdābād) is a village in Aliabad Rural District, in the Central District of Anbarabad County, Kerman Province, Iran. At the 2006 census, its population was 76, in 17 families.

References 

Populated places in Anbarabad County